KVFW-LD, virtual channel 38 (VHF digital channel 38), was a low-powered television station licensed to Fort Worth, Texas, United States and serving the Dallas–Fort Worth Metroplex. The station was owned by CMMB America. It was not available on either Charter Spectrum or FiOS from Frontier, as there is no legal requirement for a cable or satellite provider to carry a low-power station or station with an insignificant numbers of viewers.

History
KVFW-LD signed on in 1998 as a TBN Enlace affiliate on channel 65 with calls K65HA; the KVFW-LP call letters were issued in late 1999. In 2003, the station moved to channel 38 for better market coverage. Channel 65, the original channel assignment, was made a repeater without FCC authorization. After a complaint to the FCC, channel 65 was shut down. That same year, the TBN Enlace USA affiliation was moved to KDTX-TV as one of its digital subchannels. From 2004 to 2009, it was the flagship station for Reino Unido Network, a Spanish religious network operated by Templo Jesucristo Rey de Gloria. The slogan was "Venga tu Reino y Hágase tu Voluntad (a section of the Our Father in Spanish)".

In June 2009, Reino Unido Network moved its Dallas affiliation to KATA-CD2. On September 21, 2009, KVFW-LP began testing its digital signal, before going full-time digital on October 14. On June 29, 2010, the station changed its call sign to KVFW-LD, reflecting the transition to digital broadcasting.

Beginning in May 2010, KVFW-LD affiliated with the Almavision network, making the network's third return to the Dallas/Fort Worth market. However, in September 2010, KVFW returned to its previous independent Spanish Religious programming.

In early 2014, Gerald Benavides (the station's original owner) sold KVFW-LD to CMMB America, with New York Spectrum Holding Company, LLC as its licensee. That same year, KVFW-LD switched its programming to infomercials.

On January 15, 2019, KVFW-LD shut down its channel 38 digital transmitter as a part of the broadcast frequency repacking process following the 2016-2017 FCC incentive auction. The station remained silent while it constructed its post-repack facility on assigned displacement channel 7.

The Federal Communications Commission cancelled KVFW-LD's license on July 15, 2022 due to its lengthy silence and failure to construct its new facilities.

Digital channels
The station's signal was multiplexed:

References

External links

Television channels and stations established in 2000
Low-power television stations in the United States
KVFW-LD
2000 establishments in Texas
Defunct television stations in the United States
Television channels and stations disestablished in 2022
2022 disestablishments in Texas
VFW-CD